Natasha Smith was the Australian High Commissioner to Canada from February 2018 to December 2021.  The High Commission also has additional responsibility for the British Overseas Territory of Bermuda.

Her personal goal as High Commissioner was "championing diversity issues. This includes working with Canadian counterparts on indigenous issues, gender equality and Lesbian, Gay, Bisexual, Transgender and Intersex (LGBTI) rights."

Smith earned a Bachelor of Economics from James Cook University and is a Graduate of the Australian Institute of Company Directors.

References

Australian women ambassadors
High Commissioners of Australia to Canada
Living people
James Cook University alumni
Year of birth missing (living people)
High Commissioners of Australia to Bermuda